Oddskarðsgöng is a tunnel in Iceland, located in the Eastern Region along Route 92.

Oddsskarðsgöng was replaced in 2017 by Northfjarthargöng and is today closed to general traffic.

It was the third motor vehicle tunnel constructed in the country preceded only by Arnarnesgöng in the northwest and Strákagöng in the mid-north.

It was one lane wide with stopping places for passing traffic.

References 

Road tunnels in Iceland
Tunnels completed in 1977
Buildings and structures in Eastern Region (Iceland)